Car Booty is a British television programme shown on BBC One as part of their daytime schedule, and on Digital channel, Home, it was also repeated on Challenge TV for a brief period in February 2005.

The concept of the show is for a family or group who are in need of funds to sell items from around their home at a car boot sale, in order to raise the desired amount of money. There are times when there is an antique too good for the boot sale, so coverage of a family member taking an item to a specialist is often shown.

The show is presented by Lorne Spicer, who can also be seen on daytime show Money Spinners and recently on BBC's My Life For Sale. She is joined by valuer Mark Franks and from time to time Paul Hayes, who also presents the show by himself when Spicer is not available.

The show is made by Leopard Films, who also make Cash in the Attic.

External links
 
 
 

BBC Television shows
2004 British television series debuts
2010 British television series endings
English-language television shows